The 29th Legislative Assembly of Ontario was in session from October 21, 1971, until August 11, 1975, just prior to the 1975 general election. The majority party was the Ontario Progressive Conservative Party led by Bill Davis.

Allan Edward Reuter served as speaker for the assembly until October 22, 1974. Russell Daniel Rowe succeeded Reuter as speaker.

Notes

References 
Members in Parliament 29

Terms of the Legislative Assembly of Ontario
1971 establishments in Ontario
1975 disestablishments in Ontario